Cheney Joseph is a Grenadian former footballer.

He played in the infamous Barbados 4–2 Grenada game during the 1994 Caribbean Cup qualification campaign.

Joseph has been a member of the Caribbean Football Union since May 2012.

Joseph is an adopted "supporter" of English club Shrewsbury Town.

References

association footballers not categorized by position
Grenada international footballers
Grenadian footballers
living people
year of birth missing (living people)